Susannah Harker (born 26 April 1965) is an English film, television, and theatre actor. She was nominated for a BAFTA TV Award in 1990 for her role as Mattie Storin in House of Cards. She played Jane Bennet in the 1995 TV adaptation of Pride and Prejudice.

Early life and education
Harker was born in London. She is the daughter of actors Polly Adams and Richard Owens. She and her younger sister, Caroline, were brought up as Catholics and educated at a "strict" independent convent boarding school run by nuns in Sussex, and at the Central School of Speech and Drama in North London.

Acting career
Harker has acted in both contemporary and classic works, on stage, in movies and in TV series. In 1990–91 she appeared alongside Clive Owen in Chancer, and as the journalist Mattie Storin in the original House of Cards. She later played Dinah Morris in the 1991 adaptation of Adam Bede. She starred as Jane Bennet in the 1995 TV adaptation of Jane Austen's Pride and Prejudice. She is featured as Emma Fitzgerald, the love interest of Superintendent Tyburn (Trevor Eve) in the BBC TV series, Heat of the Sun (1998). In 2003 she played Clare Keightley in the audio version of the Doctor Who adventure Shada, alongside Paul McGann. 

On stage in 2005, she appeared in Simon Stephens's play On the Shore of the Wide World at the Royal National Theatre. In 2008, she played Gwendoline in Charles Wood's Jingo at the Finborough Theatre, where the London Evening Standard reviewed her performance, saying "Susannah Harker, an actress who should appear more often in our major playhouses, is in beautifully crisp form as Gwendoline."

She played Sapphire in Big Finish Productions' audio revival of Sapphire & Steel, in three series of plays released on CD between 2005 and 2008. In December 2011 Harker appeared in the BBC drama Young James Herriot. In 2012 she returned to the stage, playing the role of Sue in a London production of Mike Leigh's Abigail's Party. During early 2014 she starred in the Gate Theatre, Dublin production of The Vortex by Noël Coward.

She has also worked in radio. In 2015, she played Miss Ella Rentheim in a BBC Radio 4 production of Ibsen's John Gabriel Borkman. She played Kris in Radio 4’s 2021 drama Barred written by Thandi Lubimbi and Richard Kurti.

Personal life
Harker is a great-great-granddaughter of Joseph Harker, an artist and theatrical scene designer.

She was married to Iain Glen from 1993 to 2004; they have one son. She was later in a relationship with Paul McGann from 2006 to 2008.

Harker's sisters, Nelly Harker and Caroline Harker, are also actors.

Filmography

Film

Television

Theatre

References

External links

1965 births
Living people
Actresses from London
English film actresses
English stage actresses
English television actresses
20th-century English actresses
21st-century English actresses
Susannah
McGann family
English radio actresses